The 1968–69 Northern Premier League was the inaugural season of the Northern Premier League, a regional football league in Northern England, the northern areas of the Midlands and North Wales. The season began on 10 August 1968 and concluded on 10 May 1969.

Overview
The League featured twenty teams transferred from the Cheshire County League, the Lancashire Combination, the Midland League, the North Regional League and the West Midlands (Regional) League.

Founding teams
Cheshire County League

Altrincham
Bangor City
Hyde United
Macclesfield Town
Northwich Victoria
Runcorn
Wigan Athletic

Lancashire Combination

Chorley
Fleetwood
Morecambe
Netherfield
South Liverpool

Midland League (1889)

Gainsborough Trinity
Goole Town
Scarborough
Worksop Town

North Regional League

Ashington
Gateshead
South Shields

West Midlands (Regional) League

Boston United

League table

Results

Stadia and locations

Cup results

Challenge Cup

FA Cup

Out of the twenty clubs from the Northern Premier League only Morecambe reached for the second round:

Second Round

End of the season
At the end of the first season of the Northern Premier League none of the clubs decided to put their teams forward to be promoted to the Football League.  Chorley and Worksop Town were both relegated. Ashington resigned the League, due to financial difficulties.

Football League elections
Alongside the four Football League teams facing re-election, a total of ten non-League teams applied for election, none of which were from the Northern Premier League. All four Football League teams were re-elected.

Promotion and relegation
The following three clubs left the League at the end of the season:
Ashington resigned, demoted to Northern Alliance
Chorley relegated to Lancashire Combination
Worksop Town relegated to Midland League (1889)

The following three clubs joined the League the following season:
Stafford Rangers promoted from Cheshire County League
Great Harwood promoted from Lancashire Combination
Matlock Town promoted from Midland League (1889)

References

External links
 Northern Premier League official website
 Northern Premier League tables at RSSSF
 Football Club History Database

Northern Premier League seasons
5